Eniola Aluko (born 21 February 1987) is a British-Nigerian football executive, football broadcaster, and former professional player. She was the first Sporting Director for Angel City FC of the American National women's soccer league and formerly held the position of Sporting Director at Aston Villa W.F.C. from January 2020 to June 2021.

Born in Nigeria, Aluko made 102 appearances for the England national team from 2004 to 2016 and competed at the 2007 FIFA Women's World Cup in China, 2009 UEFA Women's Euro, 2011 FIFA Women's World Cup in Germany, 2013 UEFA Women's Euro, and 2015 FIFA Women's World Cup in Canada. At the 2012 Summer Olympics in London, she represented Great Britain.

Aluko previously played for Birmingham City, Charlton Athletic, and Chelsea in England's FA Women's Premier League. She played for Saint Louis Athletica, Atlanta Beat, and Sky Blue FC in the American Women's Professional Soccer (WPS) from 2009 to 2011. After a short stint with Birmingham City in England's new top-division league, FA WSL, she signed with Chelsea, where she played from 2012 to 2018.

Before retiring from professional football in January 2020, Aluko last played as a forward for Juventus. Since 2014 she has also provided television commentary on football, including FIFA men's and women's World Cups.

Early life
Born in Lagos, Nigeria, to Gbenga and Sileola, Aluko moved with her family to Birmingham in the West Midlands region of England at the age of six months. She grew up playing football with her brother Sone Aluko and his friends. She also played other sports, including tennis. Growing up, Aluko supported Manchester United.

Aluko started her career at Leafield Athletic Ladies and subsequently played for Birmingham City Ladies' youth team under manager Marcus Bignot with future England teammate, Karen Carney. She scored on her Birmingham team debut against Leeds United, aged 14.

Club career

Birmingham City, 2001–2004
On 7 April 2002, 15-year-old Aluko played for Birmingham in the FA Women's Premier League Cup Final at Adams Park, as the young Birmingham team lost 7–1 to professional Fulham. City did win promotion as Northern Division champions to the Premier League National Division in 2001–02. Her goalscoring during the following 2002–03 Premier League season led Bignot to declare her "the Wayne Rooney of women's football".

Aluko was named Young Player of the Year at The FA Women's Football Awards in 2003.

Charlton Athletic, 2004–2007
Aluko left Birmingham to join Charlton Athletic in January 2004. She helped Charlton defeat Fulham 1–0 to win the FA Women's Premier League Cup at Underhill Stadium in March 2004.

During the 2003–04 season, Aluko appeared as a second-half substitute when Charlton lost the FA Women's Cup final to Arsenal, 3–0 at Loftus Road in May. Charlton also lost the Premier League National Division title to Arsenal on the last day of the season, having led the way for most of the season.

Aluko lifted the FA Women's Community Shield with Charlton in August 2004 after helping the team win. Her 41st minute set-up for Ann-Marie Heatherson provided the winner in a 1–0 victory over Arsenal at Broadhall Way.

Pace was considered one of her attributes and this was evident when she sprinted onto a through ball from Emma Coss to score the winning goal in the 2005 FA Women's Cup Final at Upton Park. Charlton beat Everton 1–0 in the Final. Aluko scored two goals in the first half of Charlton's 2–1 victory over Arsenal in the 2006 FA Women's Premier League Cup Final at Adams Park.

Aluko also played in the 2005 FA Women's Community Shield (4–0 defeat at the National Hockey Stadium), the 2005 FA Women's Premier League Cup Final (3–0 defeat at Griffin Park), and the 2007 FA Women's Cup Final (4–1 defeat at the City Ground), All three defeats were inflicted by Arsenal. Her assist to Katie Holtham in the second minute of the match gave Charlton the lead in the 2007 FA Women's Cup Final. She also won the London FA Women's Cup with Charlton twice, in 2005 and 2006.

Chelsea, 2007–2009
Following the withdrawal of support for the Charlton women's team by the parent club, Aluko joined Chelsea Ladies in July 2007.

WPS, 2009–2011

In October 2008, Aluko's playing rights were obtained by St. Louis Athletica who named her as a post-draft discovery player. She was the team's leading goal scorer during the league's inaugural season with six goals, and also led in assists with four, making her one of the main reasons Athletica was able to climb from a last place in the first two months of the season to a commanding second by the end. She missed the playoffs and the All-Star match due to national team duty.

When Saint Louis Athletica folded part way through the 2010 season, Aluko signed with Atlanta Beat. She was later traded to Sky Blue FC in December 2010.

Birmingham City, 2012

When the WPS went into abeyance for the 2012 season, Aluko had already decided to return to England. She signed for Birmingham City, describing them as "more stable".

In 2012, Aluko registered five goals and two assists in 17 FA WSL League and Cup appearances, as Birmingham City finished runners up to Arsenal in both competitions. City lost the 2012 FA WSL Cup Final to Arsenal 1–0 at Underhill Stadium on 10 October 2012. Birmingham did defeat Chelsea 3–2 on penalties, after it was 2–2 at the end of extra time, in the 2012 FA Women's Cup Final on 26 May 2012 at Ashton Gate to win the club's first major honour in its 44-year history. Aluko was introduced as a 63rd-minute substitute.

Chelsea, 2012–2018
After a single season at Birmingham, she re-signed for Chelsea in December 2012. In her first season with the club, Aluko contributed six goals and three assists in 17 FA WSL League and Cup matches. Having had a poor season domestically, Chelsea reached the final of the invitational 2013 International Women's Club Championship, but lost 4–2 to INAC Kobe Leonessa. Aluko registered an assist in the Final and scored in the semi-final win against Sydney FC.

In 2014, Aluko scored seven times and provided one assist in 20 FA WSL League and Cup appearances. Aluko's Chelsea began the last day of the 2014 FA WSL season top of the league, two points ahead of Birmingham City and three points ahead of Liverpool, but a 2–1 defeat at Manchester City cost Chelsea the Super League title on goal difference.

Aluko was one of six nominations for the 2014–15 PFA Women's Players' Player of the Year, but lost out to her Chelsea teammate Ji So-yun. She did win Chelsea Ladies' Player of the Year for 2014–15 and was selected in the 2015 PFA WSL Team of the Year.

In 2015, Aluko played in the first FA Women's Cup Final held at Wembley Stadium on 1 August 2015 in front of a record attendance of 30,710. Her Chelsea team defeated Notts County 1–0 to win the club's first major trophy in its history. Individually, Aluko was at the heart of Chelsea's win as she put in a Player-of-the-Match performance and provided the assist for Ji So-yun's 39th-minute winner.

After Chelsea signed Fran Kirby and Ramona Bachmann, Aluko's role in the team diminished. It was announced on 16 May 2018 that Aluko would receive a free transfer from Chelsea when the 2017–18 season ended four days later. She marked her final appearance by scoring and had made occasional appearances, predominantly as a late substitute, in the side which remained unbeaten throughout the whole league season.

Juventus, 2018–2019
Aluko signed for Serie A club Juventus on 6 June 2018. However, in 2019 she spoke about negative experiences in the city, calling it "decades behind" and saying she had been made to feel like Pablo Escobar on occasions at Turin airport.

In November 2019, Aluko announced that she would be leaving Juventus after 18 months at the club, stating her time at the club had been one of "great success and lots of learning." She returned to Britain in December having won Serie A, Coppa Italia and Supercoppa Italiana, as well as being Juventus' top scorer for last season. On 15 January 2020, Aluko announced her retirement from professional football.

International career

England

Aluko was called into the England set-up as a 14-year-old. She chose to remain loyal to the English coaches who had given her the opportunity to play international football, but said: "The main thing for me is for people to understand that choosing to play for England doesn't mean that I don't support Nigeria. I'm as much Nigerian as I'm British. Of course Nigeria means a lot to me, it's part of me, but I've been brought up by English coaches."

Having represented England at Under-17 level, Aluko scored on her debut at Under-19 level and appeared in the UEFA Under-19 European Championship Finals in Germany in July 2003 while aged only 16 years. She later played at Under-21 level, before making her senior debut, aged 17, against the Netherlands in September 2004. Her first senior goal came against the Czech Republic at Walsall in May 2005, and she added two more in the 13–0 away win against Hungary that October.

Aluko played in UEFA Women's Euro 2005, despite a clash with her A-Level studies. She sat a history exam on the morning of England's 2–1 defeat to Denmark. In the final group game against Sweden Aluko almost scored a bizarre equaliser, but was left disappointed as hosts England lost 1–0 and exited the competition.

At the FIFA Women's World Cup 2007, Aluko featured in group matches against Japan and Argentina, as well as the 3–0 quarter-final defeat by the United States. After the tournament, she was critical of The Football Association and the level of financial support provided to England's top female players. Aluko featured much more prominently at UEFA Women's Euro 2009, scoring in the group match win over Russia and adding two more in the quarter-final victory over hosts Finland. She also provided an assist for Kelly Smith's opening goal in the semi-final against the Netherlands. In the final Aluko played the left-wing as England were mauled 6–2 by Germany in Helsinki.

Aluko netted against Switzerland in September 2010 as England qualified for the FIFA Women's World Cup 2011. During the final tournament, Aluko responded angrily to public criticism of her performance in the 1–1 draw with Mexico, in which she wasted multiple goalscoring opportunities. She was substituted at half–time in the following group match against New Zealand, and dropped to the bench for the final group match with Japan, playing the last half an hour of England's 2–0 win. Aluko was an unused substitute as England were eliminated by France at the quarter final stage.

As England qualified for the 2015 FIFA Women's World Cup, Aluko finished as the joint-top scorer in qualifying with 13 goals, which included her first hat-trick in a 10–0 thumping of Montenegro, and braces against Turkey and Ukraine. At the Finals tournament, Aluko started both of England's first two group matches, a 1–0 defeat by France and a 2–1 win over Mexico. Having missed the last group match and the knockout stages, Aluko reappeared as a 61st-minute substitute in the third-place play-off with Germany. England defeated Germany for the very first time, 1–0 after extra time to win bronze medals.

Aluko was not called up to the national team after May 2016. She was paid around £80,000 by the Football Association. The Football Association later publicly apologised to Aluko at the select committee hearing of the Department of Culture, Media and Sport (with some DCMS MPs calling for relevant FA officials to resign over their handling of the case) after the same barrister found racist remarks were made to her and teammate Drew Spence, following a third investigation. At UEFA Women's Euro 2017, Aluko worked as a pundit for Channel 4.

When England's entire team—led by black forward Nikita Parris—pointedly ran to celebrate with coach Sampson after scoring in their next match against Russia, Aluko publicly criticised her former team-mates, accusing them of selfishness, lacking respect and requiring diversity training. Parris later apologised to Aluko in an open letter in June 2020 admitting that the celebration with coach Sampson was a "thoughtless action" that showed a lack of empathy, understanding and ignorance given that Sampson was under investigation for making racially discriminatory remarks to Aluko and fellow player Drew Spence of which he was found guilty and for which the FA later apologised.

In an interview with The Daily Telegraph, England right-back Lucy Bronze questioned whether Aluko was now good enough to be in England's squad. Aluko remained surprised and disappointed at a perceived lack of support for her position from England's current players. The FA investigation had received evidence of Aluko's own "negative" behaviour, which included an alleged assault on an unnamed team-mate. Sampson's successor as England coach, Phil Neville, did not select Aluko either.

International goals for England
Scores and results list England's goal tally first.

Great Britain

2012 Olympics
In June 2012, Aluko was named in the 18-player Great Britain squad for the 2012 London Olympics. She made her Great Britain debut, in its first ever official fixture, in a friendly goalless draw with Sweden at the Riverside Stadium, Middlesbrough on 20 July 2012, starting and playing the entire match.

At the Olympic football tournament, Aluko started all three groups matches, which included wins over New Zealand, Cameroon and in front of over 70,000 at Wembley, twice Olympic silver-medalists Brazil. Aluko won a penalty in the Brazil match, which Kelly Smith missed. Britain advanced to the quarter-finals as group winners. Aluko also started as Britain lost 2–0 to Canada in the quarter-finals, courtesy of two early goals, and ended hopes of at least reaching a match for an opportunity at a medal.
Aluko had a strong appeal for a second-half penalty dismissed.

2016 Olympics
Despite England's third-place finish at the 2015 FIFA Women's World Cup, which Aluko was a part of, earning Great Britain one of the three available European slots for the 2016 Rio Olympics, it was already decided Great Britain would not send a women's team to the event. It meant Aluko did not add to her tally of five Great Britain caps, with participation at the 2020 Tokyo Olympics the next earliest available opportunity.

Executive career
In in January 2020, a week after retiring from professional football, Aluko was announced as the director of women's football at Aston Villa.

In May 2021, Aluko became the sporting director of Los Angeles-based Angel City FC ahead of their inaugural season in the American National Women's Soccer League (NWSL). In August 2022, she transitioned to the director of recruitment role as Angela Hucles became the club's general manager.

Personal life
While playing for England during Women's Euro 2005, Aluko took her A levels at Cadbury College, Birmingham. She subsequently went to study law at Brunel University, where she graduated with a first class degree in 2008. In July 2009 it was announced that Aluko would spend the 2009–10 US off-season studying for the New York bar exam before taking a similar exam in England, her aim being to have an entertainment law practice in both England and the United States.

While completing an accelerated Legal Practice Course at the University of Law, Aluko had traineeships at Lee & Thompson LLP and Onside Law. She announced her intention to "step back" from her legal career in March 2015 to focus on playing professional football. In 2016 The Football Association informed Aluko that her paid consultancy role with a sports agency breached their rules and was under investigation by the Association's integrity unit. She began working as an associate consultant for Slaughter and May, before resigning when she moved to Italy with Juventus.
 
Her younger brother Sone plays for Ipswich Town and was an England youth international, but in May 2009 accepted a call-up to represent Nigeria. Aluko helped her brother during the financial problems experienced by Rangers in 2012. Her father is a former MP in Nigeria, while Bolaji Aluko, a chemical engineering professor, is her uncle.

Aluko voted for the Conservative Party in the 2019 general elections. Her Christianity was strengthened under the influence of born again former journeyman footballer Linvoy Primus. Aluko was also listed in the 2020 Powerlist, recognition as being one of the 100 most influential Black Britons.

In May 2020, Aluko published a series of tweets that appeared to criticise people placed on the UK government's furlough scheme introduced in response to the pandemic of COVID-19, subsequently deleting most of the messages, apologising and stating her support for the furlough scheme.

In October 2022, Aluko was inducted as one of the first inductees into the WSL Hall of Fame by the Football Association.

In popular culture
In September 2014, Aluko appeared on the BBC's football programme Match of the Day, the first woman to appear as a pundit on the show. She provided commentary for ITV's coverage of the 2018 FIFA World Cup and for Fox Sports' coverage of the 2019 FIFA Women's World Cup.

She was featured along with her national teammates in the EA Sports' FIFA video game series starting in FIFA 16, the first time women players were included in the game.

In August 2016, she signed a multi-year endorsement deal with Under Armour, the first UK woman athlete to do so. In January 2020 Aluko became an Adidas ambassador.

Aluko released her autobiography They don't teach this" - Lessons in the game of life in August 2019.

Honours
Birmingham City
FA WPL Cup runner-up: 2001–02
FA WPL Northern Division: 2001–02
FA Women's Young Player of the Year: 2002–03
FA Women's Cup: 2011–12

Charlton Athletic
FA WPL National Division runner-up: 2003–04, 2004–05
FA Women's Cup: 2004–05
FA WPL Cup: 2005–06
FA Women's Community Shield: 2004

Saint Louis Athletica
Women's Professional Soccer regular season runner-up: 2009

Chelsea
FA WSL: 2015, 2017, 2017–18
FA Women's Cup: 2014–15, 2017–18
International Women's Club Championship runner-up: 2013
Juventus
Serie A: 2018–19
Coppa Italia: 2018–19
Supercoppa Italiana: 2019

England
UEFA Women's Championship runner-up: 2009
Cyprus Cup: 2009, 2013, 2015
FIFA Women's World Cup third place: 2015

Individual
Chelsea Ladies Player of the Year: 2014–15
PFA WSL Team of the Year 2015, 2017
FA WSL top scorer: 2016
Women's Super League Hall of Fame: 2022

See also
All-time Saint Louis Athletica roster
List of women's footballers with 100 or more international caps
List of England women's international footballers
List of sportswomen
List of association football families

References

Further reading
 Aluko, Eniola (2019), They Don't Teach This, Random House, 
 Caudwell, Jayne (2013), Women's Football in the UK: Continuing with Gender Analyses, Taylor & Francis, 
 Clarke, Gemma (2019), Soccerwomen: The Icons, Rebels, Stars, and Trailblazers Who Transformed the Beautiful Game, 
  Dunn, Carrie (2019), Pride of the Lionesses: The Changing Face of Women's Football in England, Pitch Publishing (Brighton) Limited, 
 Dunn, Carrie (2016), The Roar of the Lionesses: Women's Football in England, Pitch Publishing Limited, 
 Grainey, Timothy (2012), Beyond Bend It Like Beckham: The Global Phenomenon of Women's Soccer, University of Nebraska Press,

External links

Chelsea player profile
England player profile

English women's footballers
Nigerian emigrants to the United Kingdom
Birmingham City W.F.C. players
Charlton Athletic W.F.C. players
Chelsea F.C. Women players
Saint Louis Athletica players
Atlanta Beat (WPS) players
NJ/NY Gotham FC players
Black British sportswomen
England women's international footballers
FA Women's National League players
Women's Super League players
Alumni of Brunel University London
1987 births
Living people
Sportspeople from Lagos
Expatriate women's soccer players in the United States
2007 FIFA Women's World Cup players
2011 FIFA Women's World Cup players
2015 FIFA Women's World Cup players
Footballers at the 2012 Summer Olympics
Olympic footballers of Great Britain
FIFA Century Club
Women's association football forwards
Nigerian women's footballers
Juventus F.C. (women) players
Expatriate women's footballers in Italy
English expatriate sportspeople in Italy
English expatriate women's footballers
English expatriate sportspeople in the United States
Serie A (women's football) players
British sports agents
Conservative Party (UK) people
Women's Professional Soccer players
English association football commentators
WSL Hall of Fame inductees